Russula acetolens is a species of mushroom.

See also
''List of Russula species

acetolens
Fungi of Europe